The Stars (ザ・スターズ) is a Japanese psychedelic rock band. It consists of ex-members of the band White Heaven including Michio Kurihara (Ghost, collaborations with Boris, Ai Aso) on guitar, You Ishihara on vocals and Chiyo Kamekawa on bass.

Discography

 Today (2003)
 Perfect place to Hideaway (2005)
 Will (2005)

Notes

Japanese rock music groups